Openweight, also known as Absolute, is an unofficial weight class in combat sports and professional wrestling. It refers to bouts where there is no weight limit and fighters with a dramatic difference in size can compete against each other. It is different from catch weight, where competitors agree to weigh in at a certain amount without an official weight class.

Brazilian Jiu-Jitsu
The "Absolute" division has been a long staple of sports BJJ competition, it has been practiced since the beginning of the sport and it is covered by all major BJJ governing bodies such as IBJJF. All weight categories are welcome inside the Absolute Division and smaller competitors must rely on skill and techniques over larger opponents. The absolute category has also made its way to more general submission grappling competitions such as the ADCC and NAGA.

Lethwei
In International Lethwei Federation Japan Dave Leduc is the Openweight Champion.

Mixed martial arts
The sport of mixed martial arts originally had no weight classes, and martial artists of different styles and sizes were drawn together to prove which martial art is most effective in unarmed situations. By the early 2000s, weight classes were introduced and became mandatory in many countries. However, Japan became a bastion of openweight fights, nicknamed "freak show fights," with fighters such as Ikuhisa Minowa and Genki Sudo commonly facing much larger opponents. Not all open-weight fights were "freak shows" however, PRIDE Fighting Championships organized in 2000 a two-night 16-fighter "Grand Prix" (tournament) called the Pride FC: Grand Prix 2000 with the objective of finding "the world's best fighter" and consisted with the top fighters at the time, from 75.75kg (167 lb) Kazushi Sakuraba to 116 kg (255 lb) Mark Kerr. PRIDE did again an open-weight tournament in 2006 with the Pride FC: Grand Prix 2006 which was divided in three separate events instead.

The openweight division in mixed martial arts (MMA) generally groups fighters above 265 lb (120.2 kg).

Road FC currently has an openweight division.  Pancrase originally had a super heavyweight division; it was abolished and incorporated into the unlimited division.  Deep currently has an openweight division called "Megaton" although the first champion was Yusuke Kawaguchi, who weighed less than 100 kg. The Japan-based mixed martial arts promotion and sanctioning organization ZST has an openweight division. Dream, now defunct, had an openweight division with tournaments called "Super Hulk Tournament - World Superhuman Championship".

Professional Champions

Current Champions 
This table is not always up to date. Last updated on January 17, 2018.

Professional wrestling
There are many Open-weight tournament transfers in professional wrestling. Some wrestling promotions have officially designated Openweight Championships (IWGP U-30 Openweight Championship, GHC Openweight Hardcore Championship, NEVER Openweight Championship, KO-D Openweight Championship, MLW National Openweight Championship) while other promotions ignore weight classes to the point that most, if not all of their championships are effectively openweight. For example, the WWE Championship, traditionally promoted as a heavyweight title, has been held by wrestlers billed as weighing as little as 175 lbs., well below the traditional minimum weight for a wrestler to be classed as a heavyweight.

Judo
Judo has held the World Judo Open Championships where judoka from different weight classes can compete.

Sumo
In amateur and international sumo events, as sanctioned by the International Sumo Federation, openweight competitions exist alongside 3-4 weight class competitions. In professional sumo, as organized by the Japan Sumo Association, there are no weight classes and thus is de facto openweight only.

See also

1PW Openweight Championship
GHC Openweight Hardcore Championship
KO-D Openweight Championship
IWGP U-30 Openweight Championship
NEVER Openweight Championship
NEVER Openweight 6-Man Tag Team Championship
Oz Academy Openweight Championship
JWP Openweight Championship
Open the Dream Gate Championship
MLW National Openweight Championship

References

External links

Mixed martial arts weight classes
Weight classes
Professional wrestling weight classes